In enzymology, a mannotetraose 2-alpha-N-acetylglucosaminyltransferase is an enzyme that catalyzes the chemical reaction

UDP-N-acetyl-D-glucosamine + 1,3-alpha-D-mannosyl-1,2-alpha-D-mannosyl-1,2-alpha-D-mannosyl-D-mannose  UDP + 1,3-alpha-D-mannosyl-1,2-(N-acetyl-alpha-D-glucosaminyl-alpha-D-mannosyl)-1,2-alpha-D-mannosyl-D-mannose

The 2 substrates of this enzyme are UDP-N-acetyl-D-glucosamine and 1,3-alpha-D-mannosyl-1,2-alpha-D-mannosyl-1,2-alpha-D-mannosyl-D-mannose, whereas its 2 products are UDP and 1,3-alpha-D-mannosyl-1,2-(N-acetyl-alpha-D-glucosaminyl-alpha-D-mannosyl)-1,2-alpha-D-mannosyl-D-mannose.

This enzyme belongs to the family of glycosyltransferases, specifically the hexosyltransferases.  The systematic name of this enzyme class is UDP-N-acetyl-D-glucosamine:mannotetraose alpha-N-acetyl-D-glucosaminyltransferase. Other names in common use include alpha-N-acetylglucosaminyltransferase, uridine diphosphoacetylglucosamine mannoside, and alpha1->2-alphacetylglucosaminyltransferase.

References

 

EC 2.4.1
Enzymes of unknown structure